The Fort Morgan Times is a daily newspaper in Fort Morgan, Colorado. It has been published by Prairie Mountain Publishing, a unit of MediaNews Group, since 1996, when it was acquired by Hollinger.

References

External links
Fort Morgan Chamber of Commerce website 

Newspapers published in Colorado
Morgan County, Colorado
Daily newspapers published in the United States